The Columbia was a steamboat built at Astoria, Oregon in 1850. It was the first steamboat built in the Oregon Territory, and the first to establish regular service on the lower Columbia and Willamette rivers. This vessel should not be confused with the many other craft with the same or a similar name, including in particular at least four other vessels named Columbia which ran on the Columbia river or its tributaries.

Owners 
Columbia was built at upper Astoria, Oregon. One source states that the vessel was built by Gen. James Adair (1808–1888) and James Frost. John Adair was the first collector of customs for the Oregon Territory. Adair was a lawyer with political connections, and later was friend and advisor to Joseph Lane, one of Oregon's first senators. Frost, originally from Missouri, had come out to Oregon with a pioneer rifle regiment. He had been a sutler in this regiment, and his brother was quartermaster. When the American Civil War began, he returned to Missouri, where he served with the rebel militia. He lived in St. Louis, Missouri after the war. Another source states that Columbia was built by Thomas Goodwin and George Hewitt for Adair, Frost, and two others, whose names are given as Leonards and Green.

Design 
Columbia has been described as odd-shaped and clumsy-looking, and double-ended like a ferry. The vessel was built of wood and powered by sidewheels, which were driven by engines which originally came from France. James Frost had journeyed to San Francisco to purchase the engines, which were shipped up to Astoria. Another source states that the chief engineer, Thomas V. Smith, went to San Francisco to purchase engines.

First trip upriver 

Columbia began its first trip up the Columbia on the morning of July 3, 1850, with James Frost acting as captain. No one on board knew where the channel was, and the steamer's progress was slow. To act as pilots, Frost hired two young people of the Coast Salish who had been fishing on the river. By the end of the first day, they had travelled fifty miles, and Frost, not wanting to risk the vessel in the dark, tied up to the riverbank. The next morning, July 4, 1850, the steamer cast off again and proceeded upstream, arriving at Portland, Oregon (then only a small settlement) at 3:00 p.m. After staying at Portland for abouttwo hours, Columbia then proceeded on to Oregon City, arriving there at 8:00 p.m., where there was a celebration of the vessel's arrival. It had taken 26 hours to make the trip.

Later operations 

After a second trip to Oregon City, Columbia began to run regular trips between Oregon City and Astoria, connecting with the ocean steamer coming up from San Francisco that was owned by the Pacific Mail Steamship Company. Columbia was "no floating palace". Fares were $25 per person either way, with passengers to furnish their own food, which would be eaten from baskets or on blankets spread out on the deck or a table in the small cabin. Space was allocated for sleeping at night on the deck, for which there was no additional charge. Often there was standing room only on the boat.

Once gold strikes began in the west, fares could be paid in gold. One early passenger, John McCracken, reported that he once paid two ounces of gold dust for travel on the Columbia from Astoria to Portland. He had to sleep on the upper deck, the vessel was crowded, and the trip took two days. The boat did not run at night. Columbia completed with the keelboats, bateaux and sailing vessels that had provided the transport on the river, by towing barges, transporting immigrants who had reached the Cascade Rapids and general steamboat work.

For six months Columbia was the only steamboat on the river, until the Lot Whitcomb was launched on December 25, 1850. Lot Whitcomb was a vessel far superior to Columbia. The owners of Columbia dropped their fare to $15. According to one source, Mills, the backers of Lot Whitcomb refused to meet this, believing, correctly, that people would pay more to ride their superior steamer. Another source, Corning, states that Lot Whitcomb forced the Columbias fare down to $12.

Disposition 

The sources disagree as to the disposition of the vessel. Corning states that by June 1856, Columbia had made over 100 runs to Portland, and earned over $500,000 for her owners. Mills gives 1852 as the year in which the vessel was dismantled, as does the Lewis and Dryden Marine History.  Sources agree, however, that the engines of Columbia were installed in the sidewheeler Fashion, which was built in 1853. After the engines had been removed, Columbias hull was swept downstream and lost during a spring freshlet.

Notes

References 
 Affleck, Edward L., A Century of Paddlewheelers in the Pacific Northwest, the Yukon, and Alaska, Alexander Nicolls Press, Vancouver, BC 2000 
 Corning, Howard McKinley, Willamette Landings—Ghost Towns of the River, Oregon Historical Society, Portland, Oregon (2nd Ed. 1973) 
 Bancroft, Hubert Howe, History of Oregon, Vol. II 1848-1888, The History Company, San Francisco 1888
 Hines, H. K. An Illustrated History of the State of Oregon, Chicago: Lewis Pub. Co. 1893.
 Horner, John B., "Oregon: Her History, Her Great Men, Her Literature", Gazette-Times Press, Corvallis 1919
 Mills, Randall V., Sternwheelers up the Columbia—A Century of Steamboating in the Oregon Country, University of Nebraska, Lincoln, NE (1977 reprint of 1947 edition) 
 O'Neill, Dan, recollections, January 1895, published in Wright, E.W. ed., Lewis and Dryden Marine History, at 28-29.
 Wright, E.W., ed., Lewis and Dryden Marine History of the Northwest, Lewis and Dryden Printing Co., Portland, OR 1895 available on-line at the Washington Secretary of State Historical Section

Further reading 
 Faber, Jim, Steamer's Wake—Voyaging down the old marine highways of Puget Sound, British Columbia, and the Columbia River, Enetai Press, Seattle, WA 1985 
 Timmen, Fritz, Blow for the Landing, at 228-229, Caxton Press, Caldwell, ID 1973 

Steamboats of the Columbia River
Steamboats of the Willamette River
Oregon Territory
Passenger ships of the United States
Paddle steamers of Oregon
Sidewheel steamboats of Washington (state)
Ships built in Astoria, Oregon
1850 ships